Eric Allin Cornell (born December 19, 1961) is an American physicist who, along with Carl E. Wieman, was able to synthesize the first Bose–Einstein condensate in 1995. For their efforts, Cornell, Wieman, and Wolfgang Ketterle shared the Nobel Prize in Physics in 2001.

Biography
Cornell was born in Palo Alto, California, where his parents were completing graduate degrees at nearby Stanford University. Two years later he moved to Cambridge, Massachusetts, where his father was a professor of civil engineering at MIT. Here he grew up with his younger brother and sister, with yearlong intermezzos in Berkeley, California, and Lisbon, Portugal, where his father spent sabbatical years.

In Cambridge he attended Cambridge Rindge and Latin School. The year before his graduation he moved back to California with his mother and finished high school at San Francisco's Lowell High School, a local magnet school for academically talented students.

After high school he enrolled at Stanford University, where he was to meet his future wife, Celeste Landry. As an undergraduate he earned money as an assistant in the various low-temperature physics groups on campus. He was doing well both in his courses and his jobs in the labs and seemed set for a career in physics. He however doubted whether he wished to pursue such a career, or rather a different one in literature or politics. Halfway through his undergraduate years he went to China and Taiwan for nine months to volunteer teaching conversational English and to study Chinese. He learned that this was not where his talents lay, and returned to Stanford with renewed resolve to pursue his true talent – physics. He graduated with honors and distinction in 1985.

For graduate school he returned to MIT. There he joined David Pritchard's group, which had a running experiment that tried to measure the mass of the electron neutrino from the beta decay of tritium. Although he was unable to determine the mass of the neutrino, Cornell did obtain his PhD in 1990.

After obtaining his doctorate he joined Carl Wieman at the University of Colorado Boulder as a postdoctoral researcher on a small laser cooling experiment. During his two years as a postdoc he came up with a plan to combine laser cooling and evaporative cooling in a magnetic trap to create a Bose–Einstein condensate (BEC). Based on his proposal he was offered a permanent position at JILA/NIST in Boulder. In 1995 Cornell and Wieman gave the University of Colorado's George Gamow Memorial Lecture. For synthesizing the first Bose–Einstein condensate in 1995, Cornell, Wieman, and Wolfgang Ketterle shared the Nobel Prize in Physics in 2001. In 1997, Deborah S. Jin joined Cornell's group at JILA, where she led the team that produced the fermionic condensate in 2003.

He is currently a professor at the University of Colorado Boulder and a physicist at the United States Department of Commerce National Institute of Standards and Technology. His lab is located at JILA. He was awarded the Lorentz Medal in 1998 and is a Fellow of the American Association for the Advancement of Science.

He was elected a Fellow of the American Academy of Arts and Sciences in 2005.

Awards and honors
Cornell received multiple awards including the Nobel Prize in Physics in 2001.

 Ioannes Marcus Marci Medal for Molecular Spectroscopy, Ioannes Marcus Marci Spectroscopic Society, Czech Republic, 2012
 Fellow, American Academy of Arts & Sciences, 2005
 Nobel Prize in Physics 2001
 Member, National Academy of Sciences, 2000
 Fellow, Optical Society of America, Elected 2000
 R. W. Wood Prize, Optical Society of America, 1999
 Benjamin Franklin Medal in Physics, 1999
 Lorentz Medal, Royal Netherlands Academy of Arts and Sciences, 1998
 Fellow, The American Physical Society, Elected 1997
 I. I. Rabi Prize in Atomic, Molecular and Optical Physics, American Physical Society, 1997
 King Faisal International Prize in Science, 1997
 National Science Foundation Alan T. Waterman Award, 1997
 Carl Zeiss Award, Ernst Abbe Fund, 1996
 Fritz London Prize in Low Temperature Physics, 1996
 Department of Commerce Gold Medal, 1996
 Presidential Early Career Award in Science and Engineering, 1996
 Newcomb-Cleveland Prize, American Association for the Advancement of Science, 1995–96
 George Gamow Memorial Lecture, 1995
 Samuel Wesley Stratton Award, National Institute of Science and Technology, 1995

Personal life
Cornell married Celeste Landry in 1995 mere months before the BEC experiment succeeded. Their first daughter was born in 1996, and their second daughter in 1998.

In October 2004, his left arm and shoulder were amputated in an attempt to stop the spread of necrotizing fasciitis. He was discharged from the hospital in mid-December, having recovered from the infection, and returned to work part-time in April 2005. Cornell has run in the Bolder Boulder several times since moving to Boulder in 1990, most recently in 2022.

See also
Timeline of low-temperature technology

References

Bibliography

External links
Cornell Group webpage at the University of Colorado
Bose–Einstein Condensate website at the National Institute of Standards and Technology
Eric Allin Cornell Patents
  including  the Nobel Lecture December 8, 2001 Bose-Einstein Condensation in a Dilute Gas; The First 70 Years and Some Recent Experiments

1961 births
Members of the United States National Academy of Sciences
American amputees
American Nobel laureates
21st-century American physicists
Living people
Lowell High School (San Francisco) alumni
Massachusetts Institute of Technology alumni
MIT Department of Physics alumni
Nobel laureates in Physics
Stanford University alumni
University of Colorado Boulder faculty
People from Palo Alto, California
Fellows of Optica (society)
Fellows of the American Academy of Arts and Sciences
Lorentz Medal winners
Cambridge Rindge and Latin School alumni
Recipients of the Presidential Early Career Award for Scientists and Engineers
Fellows of the American Physical Society
Scientists with disabilities